Grand Duchess Elena Vladimirovna of Russia (29 January 1882 – 13 March 1957), sometimes known as Helen, Helena, Helene, Ellen, Yelena, Hélène, or Eleni, was the only daughter and youngest child of Grand Duke Vladimir Alexandrovich of Russia and Duchess Marie of Mecklenburg-Schwerin. Her husband was Prince Nicholas of Greece and Denmark and they were both first cousins of Emperor Nicholas II of Russia. She was also first cousin of Queen Juliana of the Netherlands and Alexandrine of Mecklenburg-Schwerin, Queen consort of Denmark and the grandmother of Prince Edward, Duke of Kent, Princess Alexandra, the Honourable Lady Ogilvy, and Prince Michael of Kent.

Early life
Elena and her three surviving older brothers, Kirill, Boris, and Andrei, had an English nanny and spoke English as their first language. The young Elena had a temper and was sometimes out of control. At four years old, she posed for the artist Henry Jones Thaddeus. She grabbed a paper knife and threatened her nurse, who hid behind Thaddeus. "The little lady then transferred her attentions to me, her black eyes ablaze with fury," recalled Thaddeus. Elena, raised by a mother who was highly conscious of her social status, was also considered snobbish by some. "Poor little thing, I feel sorry for her," wrote her mother's social rival, Dowager Empress Maria Feodorovna, "for she is really quite sweet, but vain and pretty grandiose."

Marriage and children
 
She was engaged to Prince Max of Baden, but Max backed out of the engagement. Elena's mother was furious and society gossiped about Elena's difficulty in finding a husband. At one point in 1899, the seventeen-year-old Elena was reputedly engaged to Archduke Franz Ferdinand of Austria, however this came to nothing as he fell in love with Countess Sophie Chotek.

Prince Nicholas of Greece and Denmark, the third son of George I of Greece, first proposed in 1900, but Elena's mother was reluctant to allow her daughter to marry a younger son with no real fortune or prospects of inheriting a throne. She finally agreed to let Elena marry Nicholas, who was Elena's second cousin through his mother Olga Constantinovna of Russia and her father Vladimir Alexandrovich of Russia, in 1902 after it became clear that no other offers were on the horizon.

The couple married on 29 August 1902 in Tsarskoye Selo, Russia. Like many imperial weddings, it was a grand affair, and was attended by the Emperor and Empress of Russia, the King and Queen of the Hellenes, among other royals and nobility of Russia.

Elena's "grand manner" irritated some people at court. According to the British diplomat Francis Elliot, there was an incident between Elena and her sister-in-law Princess Marie Bonaparte: Allegedly, Elena refused to greet Marie and "drew back her skirts as if not to be touched by her." Elena thought that Marie was beneath her, because her grandfather operated the Monte Carlo Casino. Elena looked down on another sister-in-law Princess Alice of Battenberg because of the latter's morganatic blood. The Dowager Empress wrote that Elena "has a very brusque and arrogant tone that can shock people." 

Prince and Princess Nicholas of Greece and Denmark had three daughters:

Princess Olga of Greece and Denmark (1903–1997); married Prince Paul of Yugoslavia (1893-1976) in 1923 and had issue:
Prince Alexander of Yugoslavia (1924–2016); married firstly to Princess Maria Pia of Savoy (b. 1934) from 1955 to 1967 and had issue; married secondly to Princess Barbara of Liechtenstein (b. 1942) in 1973 and had issue.
Prince Nikola of Yugoslavia (1928–1954); did not marry and had no issue.
Princess Elizabeth of Yugoslavia (b. 1936); married firstly to Howard Oxenberg (1919-2010) from 1961 to 1966 and had issue; married secondly to Neil Balfour (b. 1944) from 1969 to 1978 and had issue; married thirdly to Manuel Ulloa Elías (1922-1992) in 1987, no issue.
Princess Elizabeth of Greece and Denmark (1904–1955); married Carl Theodor, Count of Törring-Jettenbach (1900-1967)in 1934 and had issue:
Hans Veit, Count of Törring-Jettenbach (b. 1935); married Princess Henriette of Hohenlohe-Bartenstein (b. 1938) in 1964 and had issue.
Countess Helene of Törring-Jettenbach (b. 1937); married Archduke Ferdinand Karl Max of Austria (1918-2004) in 1956 and had issue.
Princess Marina of Greece and Denmark (1906–1968); married Prince George, Duke of Kent (1902-1942) in 1934 and had issue:
Prince Edward, Duke of Kent (b. 1935); married Katharine Worsley (b. 1933) in 1961 and had issue.
Princess Alexandra of Kent (b. 1936); married The Hon. Sir Angus Ogilvy (1928-2004) in 1963 and had issue.
Prince Michael of Kent (b. 1942); married Baroness Marie-Christine von Reibnitz (b. 1945) in 1978 and had issue.

Grand Duchess Elena suffered from ill health after the birth of Princess Marina, which caused her husband anguish. 

According to her niece, Princess Sophie of Greece, Grand Duchess Elena's priorities, throughout her life, remained as follows: “God first, the Grand Dukes of Russia then and finally everything else.” Thus, the Grand Duchess and her husband, Prince Nicholas, visited Russia annually to visit their relatives.

Life in exile

The family was later affected by the turmoil of the Russian Revolution of 1917 and the subsequent turmoil in Greece, which became a republic and resulted in the family living in France for a time.

While living in France Grand Duchess Elena became deeply involved in charity work for Russian exiles, particularly children. Short of money due to their exile from Greece and the loss of their Russian income, Prince Nicholas and his family lived in reduced, but elegant, circumstances. Grand Duchess Elena's fabulous jewel collection, as well as Prince Nicholas' own artwork, were their sources of income.

Princess Olga of Greece married Prince Paul of Yugoslavia; Princess Elizabeth of Greece married Count Karl Theodor zu Toerring-Jettenbach, son of Duchess Sophie in Bavaria and scion of an old and rich Bavarian mediatized family; and Princess Marina of Greece married the Prince George, Duke of Kent in November 1934.

Grand Duchess Elena became a widow early in 1938, as Prince Nicholas suffered a heart attack and died suddenly. She remained in Greece throughout the Second World War, dying there in 1957. She bequeathed her personal library to the Anavryta School.

Ancestry

References

Sources
Charlotte Zeepvat, The Camera and the Tsars: A Romanov Family Album, Sutton Publishing, 2004, 

1882 births
1957 deaths
Royalty from Saint Petersburg
People from Tsarskoselsky Uyezd
House of Holstein-Gottorp-Romanov
Russian exiles
House of Glücksburg (Greece)
Russian grand duchesses
Russian philanthropists
White Russian emigrants to Greece
19th-century people from the Russian Empire
20th-century Russian people
19th-century women from the Russian Empire
20th-century Russian women
Emigrants from the Russian Empire to Greece
Burials at Tatoi Palace Royal Cemetery